Shehu Idris (20 February 193620 September 2020) was a Nigerian teacher who served as the 18th Emir of Zazzau, a Nigerian traditional state headquartered in Zaria. He also served as chairman of Zazzau Emirate Council and Kaduna State Council of Chiefs. A member of the Fula people, he ascended the throne on 8 February 1975 following the demise of Alhaji Muhammadu Aminu, his predecessor. Idris was the longest reigning monarch in the history of the Zazzau emirate, having reigned for 45 years from 1975 to 2020. He was succeeded by Ahmed Nuhu Bamalli as the 19th Emir of Zazzau.

Early life and education
Shehu Idris was born to the family of Maiunguwa Idrisu Auta, a ward head of Unguwar Iya which is a ward between Unguwar Durumi and Kuyanbana in Zazzau Emirate, his father was sometimes called Autan Sambo while his mother was called Hajiya Aminatu. His father, Maiunguwa Idris was nicknamed Auta because he was the last born of the Emir of Zazzau  Muhammadu Sambo who reigned from c. 1879 to 1888, Emir Muhammadu Sambo was the second child of Emir of Zazzau Abdulkarimi who reigned from 1834–1846, as such his father was a Ward Head while his Grandfather and Great-Grandfather were Emirs in Zazzau Emirate

Idris started his education being tutored by two Islamic scholars in Zaria and then continued  with formal studies at the Zaria Elementary School. He was at the elementary school from 1947 to 1950, during which period he lost his father at the age of 12. Idris continued both his qur’anic  and formal education and enrolled in the Zaria Middle School in 1950 and finished studies in 1955. He then attended Katsina Training College to become a teacher.

Later life and career 
In 1958, he was a teacher at a school in Hunkuyi and then taught at a few other schools in Zaria. In the 1960s, he was a private secretary to the late Emir of Zazzau Muhammadu Aminu, and was also appointed as the secretary to the Zaria Native Authority council in 1965. In 1973, he was bestowed the title of Dan Madamin Zaria and was appointed the district head of Zaria.

Idris succeeded Emir Aminu after his death in 1975. On 10 January 2015 he celebrated the 40th anniversary of his coronation, and on 8 February 2020, he celebrated the 45th anniversary of his coronation.

Death 
Idris died around 11:00 am GMT+1 on 20 September 2020, at the 44 Nigerian Army Reference hospital in Kaduna.

References

Ahmadu Bello University alumni
1936 births
2020 deaths
Emirs of Zazzau
People from Zaria
Nigerian traditional rulers